Alain Dister (25 December 1941 – 2 July 2008) was a French journalist, author and photographer. He wrote numerous works on the subjects of Rock music, the 1960s, and the Beat literary movement in the United States. 

Dister worked for the French magazines Rock & Folk and Connaissance des arts. He was a chronicler of the emerging Rock scene in America who wrote articles and books, and published photographs of musicians and groups such as Jimi Hendrix, The Beatles, Frank Zappa, Pink Floyd, Led Zeppelin, The Cure, Johnny Hallyday, and Grateful Dead.

Career
Alain Dister was born in Lyon on 25 December 1941. He was among the first European photographers to join the Haight Ashbury scene in San Francisco in the mid-1960s (sexual liberation, drugs, psychedelic music, etc.) and chronicled the Summer of Love. He lived with key Beat Generation authors and artists, including Allen Ginsberg and Gregory Corso, the subject of his book La Beat Generation: La révolution hallucinée (1997). In Oh, hippie days! (2001), he wrote about the American counter-culture at the end of the 1960s. Maintaining an interest in popular culture, he followed the emerging Punk scene in Japan in the 1990s.

As a photographer, Dister was best known for his photographs of the world of Rock and Roll in the United States in the 1960s. In the summer of 1966, he lived in New York for a while and was a regular at the Café Wha? when Jimi Hendrix was playing there with his band, Jimmy James and the Blue Flames. After publishing his first article in issue #4 of Rock & Folk, Dister was sent to London in February 1967 by the head of Atlantic Records' French subsidiary, to interview Hendrix and take photographs. When Hendrix traveled to Paris the following month to promote his first singles, Barclay Records appointed Dister to act as facilitator and take photographs, which would later feature on the covers of the French & Benelux releases of "Hey Joe" / "Stone Free", "The Wind Cries Mary" / "Highway Chile", and the album Electric Ladyland.         

Dister's photographic work has been exhibited in various museums and galleries around the world. He was a promoter of French culture and an art critic for the journal Connaissance des arts. His view of the attitudes and aesthetics of Rock, of Punk, and of other genres ignored by academics (especially in France) made him a witness of the counter-culture in America.

He resided and worked in Paris and Burgundy, and died after a long illness on 2 July 2008.

Exhibitions
 1973 : Séquences et Conséquences, musée d'art moderne, Paris, France
 1983 : La Ville en ses jardins, CNAC G. Pompidou, Paris, France
 1986 : Soirée Des stars sur la passerelle et Rock et photo, Rencontres d'Arles.
 1990 : Visions of the Road, Palais des Beaux Arts, Charleroi, Belgique
 1991 : Franco Fontana Collezione, Museo d'Arte Moderna, Modène, Italie
 1994 : La Jeune Fille dans la ville, Galerie du Jour/Agnès B, Paris, France
 1997 : Rock'n'Roll Attitudes, Espace Photographique de la Ville, Paris, France
 1998 : Macadam Blues, FNAC Étoile, Paris, France
 1999 : Agnès b gallery Shibuya, Tokyo, Japon
 1999 : AND's gallery, Osaka, Japon
 2000 : Gracie Mansion Gallery, New York, États-Unis
 2007 : FNAC Forum et FNAC Montparnasse
 2010 : Les Rencontres d'Arles, France.
 2013 : Portraits de rock, Aulnay-sous-Bois, France

Bibliography

References

External links
 Electric Ladyland (Barclay) at vinyl-records.nl

1941 births
2008 deaths
French photographers
Writers from Lyon